Kurt Stöpel (12 March 1908 – 11 June 1997) was a German professional road bicycle racer. In the 1932 Tour de France, Stöpel won the second stage and was leading the general classification for one day, and finished in second place in the final general classification. He was the first German to wear the yellow jersey, and the first German to finish on the podium in Paris. He won the German National Road Race in 1934.

Major results

1931
Stage 12 Deutschland Tour
1932
Tour de France:
Winner stage 2
Wearing yellow jersey for one day
Second place general classification
1934
 national road race champion
Rund um Köln

References

External links 

1908 births
1997 deaths
German male cyclists
German Tour de France stage winners
Cyclists from Berlin
German cycling road race champions
20th-century German people